Andrena impolita, the unpolished miner, is a species of mining bee in the family Andrenidae. It is found in Central America and North America.

References

Further reading

 
 

impolita
Articles created by Qbugbot
Insects described in 1987